Holly Springs-Marshall County Airport  is a city-owned, public-use airport located four nautical miles (5 mi, 7 km) west of the central business district of Holly Springs, a city in Marshall County, Mississippi, United States. Owned by the City of Holly Springs, it is included in the National Plan of Integrated Airport Systems for 2011–2015, which categorized it as a general aviation facility.

Facilities and aircraft 
Holly Springs-Marshall County Airport covers an area of 94 acres (38 ha) at an elevation of 551 feet (168 m) above mean sea level. It has one runway designated 18/36 with an asphalt surface measuring 3,202 by 60 feet (976 x 18 m).

For the 12-month period ending October 3, 2012, the airport had 12,680 aircraft operations, an average of 34 per day: 99% general aviation and 1% military. At that time there were 10 single-engine aircraft based at this airport.

See also 
 List of airports in Mississippi

References

External links 
 John Jewell Aircraft, the fixed-base operator (FBO)
 Aerial image as of February 1991 from USGS The National Map
 
 

Airports in Mississippi
Buildings and structures in Holly Springs, Mississippi
Transportation in Marshall County, Mississippi